Clubul Sportiv Orǎșenesc Boldești-Scăeni, commonly known as CSO Boldești-Scăeni, or simply as Boldești-Scăeni, is a Romanian football club based in Boldești-Scăeni, Prahova County, currently playing in Liga IV – Prahova County, the fourth tier of the Romanian football league system. The club was founded in 1947 as Petrolistul Boldești and played for twenty-six seasons in the third Romanian football league.

History
Founded in 1947, as the team belonging to the Boldești Scaffold Petroleum, Petrolistul Boldești played, until 1968, in the district and regional championships. In 1968, as a result of the reorganization of Divizia C, the number of teams in this tier increased from 56 (4 series of 14 teams) to 128 (8 series of 16 teams). Occupying the third place in the East Series of the Ploiești Regional Championship with 29 points (13 wins, 3 draws, 6 losses and 34–25 goals), Petrolistul promoted to Divizia C.

Between 1979 and 1994, the club has evolved into the county championship two times, 1988 and 1990, being close to promotion, finally taking the second place. 1993–94 Divizia C – Prahova County season was dominated by the Petrolistul, who held the first position without "knowing" the defeat (record of the competition) with the following ranking: 30 22 8 0 71–18 52 points.
Petrolistul has promoted in Divizia B (as it was then called the third elite of Romanian football, after the National League and Divizia A), with two victories in the play–off match against Victoria Ozun from Covasna County ( 5–0 at Boldești and 3–1 at Ozun).

Remaining without funding, in 2008 the team merged with Voința Kaproni Gornet – a team promoted in that year in the Liga III, becoming Petrolistul Kaproni Boldești. Under this name it was active at this level until the end of the 2009–10 season, when, although occupying the 7th place, owner George Negoițescu, decided to disband the team and gave the place in the Liga III to AFC Filipeștii de Pãdure.

In the summer of 2010, at the initiative of the mayor of Boldești-Scăeni, Constantin Bucuroiu, and the leader of the Boldești Scaffold syndicate, Mihai Nicolescu, „Boldeștina” reappeared in the landscape of the Prahova County football, evolving in the North Series of the Liga V – Prahova County, the fifth tier of the Romanian football league system, which they won without a defeat, promoting to Liga IV – Prahova County.

In the 2014–15 season, Petrolistul Boldești won the Liga IV – Prahova County and the promotion play-off (3–0 at home and 3–0 away) played against Unirea Fierbinți, the winner of Liga IV – Ialomița County, promoted to Liga III.

In the summer of 2022,  the club was renamed as CSO Boldești-Scăeni.

Honours
Liga III:
Runners–up (2): 2001–02, 2003–04

Liga IV – Prahova County
Winners (3): 1993–94, 1999–00, 2014–15
Runners–up (4): 1987–88, 1989–90, 2012–13, 2013–14

Liga V – Prahova County
Winners (1): 2010–11

Other performances 
Appearances in Liga III: 26
Best finish in Cupa României: Round of 32 (1995–96), (2013–14)

Club officials

Board of directors

Current technical staff

League history

References

External links
AJF Prahova club profile

Football clubs in Prahova County
Association football clubs established in 1947
Liga III clubs
Liga IV clubs
1947 establishments in Romania
Works association football clubs in Romania